Actinella obserata is a species of air-breathing land snail, a terrestrial pulmonate gastropod mollusk in the family Geometridae. This species is endemic to Madeira, Portugal.

References

Actinella
Molluscs of Madeira
Endemic fauna of Madeira
Critically endangered animals
Taxa named by Richard Thomas Lowe
Gastropods described in 1852
Taxonomy articles created by Polbot